Ectoedemia heckfordi is a moth of the family Nepticulidae. It is only known from Devon in Great Britain, having been discovered in 2004 at the National Trust's Hembury Woods by amateur naturalist Bob Heckford, for whom it is named.

The wingspan is 4.8–6.2 mm. Adults are on wing from April to May. There is one generation per year.

The bright green larvae feed on oaks, Quercus petraea and Quercus robur. They mine the leaves of their host plant. The mine consists of a short, highly contorted gallery, occupying a small space only, filled with black frass, later broken. The mine suddenly enlarges into an elongated blotch, with frass concentrated in two lines along the edges. The mines usually occur on saplings, seedlings or low growth and in shade.

In April 2010, Heckford presented the type specimen to the Natural History Museum in London.

References

External links 
Fauna Europaea
bladmineerders.nl
Western Palaearctic Ectoedemia (Zimmermannia) Hering and Ectoedemia Busck s. str. (Lepidoptera, Nepticulidae): five new species and new data on distribution, hostplants and recognition

Nepticulidae
Dartmoor
Moths of Europe
Moths described in 2009